Hoogvliet is a borough of Rotterdam, Netherlands. As of 1 January 2004, it had 36,619 inhabitants. There is also a national chain of Dutch supermarkets with the same name.

History
The village Hoogvliet was first mentioned on 26 May 1326 in the archive of the heren van Putten & Strijen inv. nr. 144. It used to be called Oedenvliet, Oudenvliet and Odenvliet. It was a separate municipality between 1817 and 1934, when it merged with Rotterdam.

Districts
Middengebied (the area around metrostation Hoogvliet, the Binnenban mall, an indoor swimming pool and a sports centre).
Boomgaardshoek
Oudeland
Nieuw Engeland
Tussenwater (with metrostation Tussenwater).
Westpunt
Zalmplaat (with metrostation Zalmplaat).
Meeuwenplaat
Oudewal

Public transportation
Hoogvliet has a connection to the city of Rotterdam by Rotterdam Metro lines C and D, through Tussenwater, Hoogvliet, and Zalmplaat stations.

Parking places are free of charge. During rush hours and if the Spijkenisser bridge is open, the road from the freeway to Spijkenisse may be clogged.

References

Populated places in South Holland
Former municipalities of South Holland
Boroughs of Rotterdam